José Luis Clerc was the defending champion but did not compete that year.

Joakim Nyström won in the final 6–2, 7–5 against Tim Wilkison.

Seeds
A champion seed is indicated in bold text while text in italics indicates the round in which that seed was eliminated.

Draw

Finals

Top half

Section 1

Section 2

Bottom half

Section 3

Section 4

External links
 1984 Volvo International draw

Singles